St Cuthbert's Church may refer to:

United Kingdom
St Cuthbert's Church, Churchtown, Merseyside
St Cuthbert's Church, Crayke, North Yorkshire
St Cuthbert's Church, Darwen, Lancashire
 St Cuthbert's Church, Dunoon, Scotland
St Cuthbert's Church, Durham, County Durham
Durham Cathedral, formally known as the Cathedral Church of Christ, Blessed Mary the Virgin and St Cuthbert of Durham
St Cuthbert's Church, Edenhall, Cumbria
St Cuthbert's Church, Elsdon, Northumberland
St Cuthbert's Church, Edinburgh, Scotland
St Cuthbert's Church, Halsall, Lancashire
St Cuthbert's Church, Holme Lacy, Herefordshire
St Cuthbert's Church, Lytham, Lancashire
St Cuthbert's Church, Marton, Middlesbrough
Church of St Cuthbert by the Forest, Mouldsworth, Cheshire
Old St Cuthbert's Church, Oborne, Dorset
St Cuthbert's Church, Over Kellet, Lancashire
St Cuthbert's Church, Redmarshall, County Durham
Church of St Cuthbert, Wells, Somerset
St Cuthbert's RC Church, Edinburgh, Scotland

See also
St Mary and St Cuthbert, Chester-le-Street, County Durham